Atlético Desportivo Petróleos do Namibe, formerly Onze Bravos do Sacomar and Desportivo Sonangol do Namibe and simply known as Atlético do Namibe, named after its major sponsor Sonangol, is Angolan football club based in Moçâmedes, the capital city of the Namibe Province. The name change took place in June 2005. The team play their home games at the Estádio Joaquim Morais.
Its major achievements include 2 Angola cup titles won in 2001 and 2004. The club was relegated from the Angolan Premier Division, Girabola in the end of the 2007 championship.

Achievements
 Angolan Cup: 2 
2001, 2004

Performance in CAF competitions
CAF Confederation Cup: 1 appearance
2005 – Preliminary Round
CAF Cup Winners' Cup: 1 appearance
2002 – First Round

League & Cup Positions

Manager history

Players

2001-2013

1994-2000

See also
 Girabola
 Gira Angola

External links
 2013 squad at girabola.com

References

Football clubs in Angola
1986 establishments in Angola
Sports clubs in Angola